Roger Hsieh or Hsieh Tsung-min (2 May 1934 – 8 September 2019) was a Taiwanese politician. He won election to the Legislative Yuan in 1992 and 1995, losing reelection in 1998 and 2001.

Education and activism
Hsieh attended Taichung First High School, studied law at National Taiwan University alongside , and completed graduate work in political science at National Chengchi University.

While studying at National Taiwan University, Hsieh, Wei and legal academic Peng Ming-min printed ten thousand copies of the "," a manifesto advocating the overthrow of the Kuomintang one-party state. The three were promptly arrested; Hsieh was subject to torture. Hsieh and Wei were later released but did not play a role in their mentor's escape to Sweden, though the government suspected the pair of aiding Peng. Hsieh and Wei were jailed for a second time in 1971. For his support of democracy, Hsieh spent over eleven years behind bars. 

Following his release, Hsieh spent seven years in the United States, and returned to Taiwan in 1986.  at Chiang Kai-shek International Airport on 30 November 1986 to show support for Hsieh and fellow dissident Hsu Hsin-liang. Barred from entry into Taiwan on that day, the two explored alternative means of getting into the country and eventually succeeded.

In December 2018, Hsieh was exonerated by the Transitional Justice Commission.

Political career
Another NTU classmate, Kuomintang member Shih Chi-yang, aided Hsieh's early political career. With the support of Huang Hsin-chieh, Hsieh was elected to the Legislative Yuan in 1992 and 1995, though he lost election in 1998. During his legislative tenure, Hsieh attempted to pass bills regarding compensation to victims of the White Terror like himself. According to legislative inquires launched by Hsieh, the White Terror period saw over 29,000 people tried in court. Subsequently, Hsieh was named an adviser to President Chen Shui-bian. While serving in this position, Hsieh spent much of his time investigating the La Fayette-class frigate scandal. As a result of Hsieh's probe, Andrew Wang, an accused arms dealer, filed a lawsuit against him in August 2001, an action that was later reviewed by the Control Yuan. Hsieh resigned as presidential adviser in 2001 to run in that year's legislative elections.

Death
Hsieh died in a hospital in New Taipei on 8 September 2019, aged 85.

References

1934 births
2019 deaths
Prisoners and detainees of Taiwan
Taiwanese democracy activists
Taiwanese prisoners and detainees
Taiwanese people of Hoklo descent
Taiwanese revolutionaries
National Taiwan University alumni
National Chengchi University alumni
Members of the 2nd Legislative Yuan
Members of the 3rd Legislative Yuan
Changhua County Members of the Legislative Yuan
Party List Members of the Legislative Yuan
Democratic Progressive Party Members of the Legislative Yuan
Senior Advisors to President Chen Shui-bian
Taiwanese expatriates in the United States